The Sweden national under-20 football team is the football team representing Sweden in FIFA U-20 World Cup and is controlled by the Swedish Football Association. Sweden made their first and so far only FIFA U-20 World Cup appearance in 1991 and was knocked out in the group stage.

The qualification to the FIFA U-20 World Cup for the European teams is the European Under-19 Championship. Therefore, the Swedish Under-20 team doesn't formally play any qualification matches. In 1991 the team was managed by Ulf Lyfors.

FIFA U-20 World Cup record
 Champions   Runners-up   Third place   Fourth place   Tournament held on home soil

1991 fixtures

1991 FIFA World Youth Championship squad
The following 18 players were called up for the 1991 FIFA World Youth Championship.

Caps, goals, ages and club information updated as of 30 June 1991.

Other call-ups in 1991
The following five players were also called up to the Sweden U20 squad during 1991.

See also
 Sweden national football team
 Sweden Olympic football team
 Sweden national under-21 football team
 Sweden national under-19 football team
 Sweden national under-17 football team
 Sweden national football B team (defunct) 
 FIFA U-20 World Cup

References

External links
Team results in 1991

European national under-20 association football teams
F